The Expedition League is a collegiate summer baseball league in the Great Plains region of the United States and Canada. The league was founded in 2015 in Rapid City, South Dakota, by Steve Wagner, who also serves as president. The league's inaugural season was 2018 with eight teams.

Teams play a 62-game season from late May through the beginning of August. Playoffs take place in the second week of August with teams seeded for the playoffs, with each team making the playoffs.  The first round of the playoffs is a best-of-three series and the League Championship Series is also a best-of-three series.

History
The league was founded in 2015 and featured eight teams in its inaugural season that began in May 2018. It added the Wheat City Whiskey Jacks and the Fremont Moo for the 2019 season.

The Rapid City Jackalopes, originally announced for the 2020 season, were described in early 2020 as being "at least one more year away" due to the lack of a suitable stadium. The Hub City Hotshots suspended operations for the 2020 season and the city of Aberdeen, South Dakota terminated their contract for use of Fossum Field. In December 2019, the Sioux Falls Sunfish announced that the team would begin play in the 2020 season, playing at Karras Park Home of Ronken Field in Sioux Falls, South Dakota; due to COVID, they started playing in 2021. The Canyon County Spuds and the Mining City Tommyknockers joined the league for the 2021 season in Caldwell, Idaho and Butte, Montana, respectively. In February 2021, the league announced plans for a new team in Grand Forks, North Dakota, later named the Red River Pilots, to debut in 2022. Due to the COVID-19 pandemic closing the US-Canada border, the Wheat City Whiskey Jacks played their 2021 home games at Kraft Field in Grand Forks, North Dakota. The Pierre Trappers chose not to seek renewal of their ballpark lease after the 2022 season.

Teams

Membership timeline

Champions
2022  Souris Valley Sabre Dogs
2021  Souris Valley Sabre Dogs
2020  Fremont Moo
2019  Badland Big Sticks
2018  Western Nebraska Pioneers

Notable Expedition League alumni
Jacen Roberson, Western Nebraska Pioneers (2019). 16th Round, Arizona Diamondbacks, 2021
Jack Sinclair, Western Nebraska Pioneers (2018). 16th Round, Washington Nationals, 2021
Austin Callahan, Fremont Moo (2021). 18th Round, Cincinnati Reds, 2021
Robert Cruz, Casper Horseheads (2018-19). Free Agent, Washington Nationals, 2021
Alex Achtermann, Western Nebraska Pioneers(2018). 30th Round, Colorado Rockies, 2019
Jackson Pokorney, Wheat City Whiskey Jacks(2019)/Souris Valley Sabre Dogs(2020). 29th Round, Atlanta Braves, 2016
Cal Smith, Pierre Trappers(2018). 33rd Round, Boston Red Sox, 2015

References

External links
 Official Website

 
Summer baseball leagues
Baseball leagues in North Dakota
Baseball leagues in South Dakota
Baseball leagues in Nebraska
Baseball leagues in Wyoming
Baseball in Manitoba
College baseball leagues in the United States
2017 establishments in South Dakota
Sports leagues established in 2017